How It Goes is the third studio album by Boston ska punk band, Big D and the Kids Table, released in 2004. Strong language is used on the album and consequently it is released with the parental advisory sticker for strong language on songs such as "LAX".

Track listing
 "The Sounds of Allston Village" - 2:20
 "LA.X" - 5:05
 "New Nail Bed" - 3:37
 "If We Want To" - 4:10
 "Flashlight" - 5:10
 "Girls Against Drunk Bitches" - 3:23
 "You Lost, You're Crazy" - 2:08
 "Bender" - 3:32
 "Safe Haven" - 4:31
 "You're Me Now" - 3:40
 "Voice Alone" - 5:35
 "My Girlfriend's On Drugs" - 3:07
 "President" - 2:37
 "Cutshow" - 3:30
 "Little Bitch" - 2:17
 "(We All Have To) Burn Something" - 3:17
 "175" - 4:30
 "Chicago" - 3:52
 "How It Goes" - 5:45
 "Moment Without An End" - 4:10

Credits
David McWane - vocals
Sean P. Rogan - Guitar/Backing Vocals
Steve Foote - Bass
Paul E. Cuttler - Trombone
Dan Stoppelman - Trumpet
Chris Bush - Tenor Sax
Jon Reilly - drums (performs only in music videos, not on album)
Shawn Florezzz - Merchandise, Driving, Organizing, Advice, and Ideas
Drums performed by Jason Gilbert

References

2004 albums
Big D and the Kids Table albums
Skate punk albums